In logic and mathematics, statements  and  are said to be logically equivalent if they have the same truth value in every model.
However, these symbols are also used for material equivalence, so proper interpretation would depend on the context. Logical equivalence is different from material equivalence, although the two concepts are intrinsically related.

Logical equivalences
In logic, many common logical equivalences exist and are often listed as laws or properties. The following tables illustrate some of these.

General logical equivalences

Logical equivalences involving conditional statements

Logical equivalences involving biconditionals

Examples

In logic 
The following statements are logically equivalent:

If Lisa is in Denmark, then she is in Europe (a statement of the form ).
If Lisa is not in Europe, then she is not in Denmark (a statement of the form ).

Syntactically, (1) and (2) are derivable from each other via the rules of contraposition and double negation.  Semantically, (1) and (2) are true in exactly the same models (interpretations, valuations); namely, those in which either Lisa is in Denmark is false or Lisa is in Europe is true.

(Note that in this example, classical logic is assumed. Some non-classical logics do not deem (1) and (2) to be logically equivalent.)

Relation to material equivalence

Logical equivalence is different from material equivalence.

This statement expresses the idea "' if and only if '". In particular, the truth value of  can change from one model to another.

The statements are logically equivalent if, in every model, they have the same truth value.

See also

 Entailment
 Equisatisfiability
 If and only if
 Logical biconditional
 Logical equality
 ≡ the iff symbol (U+2261 IDENTICAL TO)
 ∷ the a is to b as c is to d symbol (U+2237 PROPORTION)
 ⇔ the double struck biconditional (U+21D4 LEFT RIGHT DOUBLE ARROW)
 ↔ the bidirectional arrow (U+2194 LEFT RIGHT ARROW)

References 

Mathematical logic
Metalogic
Logical consequence
Equivalence (mathematics)